The Fort Ripley Shoal Light or Middle Ground Light was a lighthouse in the Charleston, South Carolina harbor approaches.

History
The channels approaching Charleston fork shortly after passing Fort Sumter, split by a large shoal extending southeast from Shutes' Folly Island. The southern portion, known as the Middle Ground, was the site of the Civil War-era , cobbled together on an artificial island. The fort has since slumped beneath the waves; it is now evidenced by nothing more than a daymark and notation of submerged rocks on nautical charts.

In 1878 a screw-pile lighthouse was erected a short distance from the remains of the fort, to mark the shoal. Little is recorded of its history, and it was deactivated and dismantled in 1932. However, a much larger skeleton tower was erected on the same site to replace the old rear light of the Fort Sumter Range. This tower remains in service, though it's unnamed on charts.

References

Citations

Bibliography
 

 ID COMDTPUB P16502.3

Lighthouses completed in 1878
Lighthouses in South Carolina
Buildings and structures in Charleston, South Carolina